Sneaker collecting is the acquisition and trading of sneakers as a hobby. It is often manifested by the use and collection of shoes made for particular sports, particularly basketball and skateboarding. A person involved in sneaker collecting is sometimes called a sneakerhead.

The birth of sneaker collecting, subsequently creating the sneakerhead culture in the United States came in the 1980s and can be attributed to two major sources: basketball, specifically the emergence of Michael Jordan and his eponymous Air Jordan line of shoes released in 1985, and the growth of hip hop music. The boom of signature basketball shoes during this era provided the sheer variety necessary for a collecting subculture, while the hip-hop movement gave the sneakers their street credibility as status symbols. The sneakerhead culture has emerged in the United Kingdom and the Czech Republic during the early 2010s.

By the beginning of the 2020s, sneakerhead culture had become fully global in nature, partially due to "athleisure" attire becoming increasingly popular at both the low- and high-ends of the fashion world. It also extended beyond its focus on shoes designed for particular sports, with Kanye West's Yeezy line produced by Adidas serving as a well-known example.

Styles and marketing

Several popular brands and styles of sneakers have emerged as collectors items in the sneakerhead subculture. Popular collections include Air Jordans, Air Force Ones, Nike Dunks, Nike Skateboarding (SB), Nike Foamposites, Nike Air Max, and more recently, the Yeezy line produced by Adidas but sold & marketed separately from its primary sneaker models. Shoes that have the most value are usually exclusive or limited editions. Also, certain color schemes may be rarer relative to others in the same sneaker, inflating desirability and value. More recently, sneaker customs, or one-of-a-kind sneakers that have been hand-painted, have become popular as well.

Nike, New Balance, and Reebok also have custom shops where people can choose from the color, lettering, and materials that they want. Adidas discontinued their custom shop in February 2019.

Nike continues to use basketball stars to market new sneakers. In 2011, the Zoom Hyperdunk was introduced through Blake Griffin (a Los Angeles Clippers player and NBA 2010–11 NBA Rookie of the Year). Nike has also employed celebrities from outside of the sports world to design and market new shoe lines. One example is the Nike Air Yeezy, designed by rapper Kanye West and released in 2009, as well as the Nike Air Yeezy II, released in 2012. West's relationship with Nike soured after that point, however, and in 2013 he parted ways with the company and migrated his Yeezy line of sneakers over to Adidas, which were originally produced only in limited numbers but expanded to millions sold with each "drop" beginning in 2018.

Skateboarding, since about 2005, has been a major player in the shoe collecting industry especially with the variety introduced with the Nike SB, Vans, DC and Supra product lines. As of 2020, Nike Dunks – a model originally designed for basketball, but later embraced by skateboarders in low-top form (hence the name "Nike SB") – had emerged as one of the most widely coveted sneakerhead shoes, particularly in terms of unusual collaborations with the likes of Ben & Jerry's and the Grateful Dead. The most popular Air Jordan archival models – nearly all of which sell out within minutes after a new version is introduced, or a coveted retro colorway (e.g. the original Air Jordan 1 in its black-and-red "bred" colorway that was later banned by the NBA) is reissued – include the Jordan 1, 3, 4, 5 and 11.

Sneakerhead subculture
The sneakerhead subculture originated in the United States during the late 1980s and had gone global by the end of the 1990s. Hardcore sneaker collectors in Britain, Europe, and the US buy online and go to outlets, sneaker events, swapmeets, parties, and gatherings in search of rare, deadstock, vintage, and limited edition shoes to invest in. Given the extent to which former cult favorite sneakers have become popular with mainstream consumers, however, new launches of "hot" sneaker models increasingly take place via online raffles through sneaker and skateboarding boutiques, as well as Nike's SNKRS phone app and Adidas's similar Confirmed app.

Originally popular among urban black youth and white skateboarders, by the 21st century, it had also gained a sizable Asian following especially in the Philippines, Malaysia, India, and China. That said, sneakers have had cult followings in Japan – where many American fashion brands remain highly covetable – since the 1990s, and outside the US, Japan is one of the only markets where limited-edition styles (particularly Nikes) sold solely within the country have had region-exclusive drops.

Sneakerheads collect sneakers from different brands depending on their preference. In terms of collectible sneakers that can usually be resold for well above their original retail price, the most coveted brands among sneakerheads are Nike, Air Jordan and Yeezy; models from more mainstream manufacturers such as New Balance, Puma, Vans and Reebok rarely yield significant returns, with the exception of certain collaborations with various athletes and, increasingly, celebrities with no direct ties to pro sports, including Rihanna, Drake and Vogue global editorial director Anna Wintour. Nike (including the company's Air Jordan brand) and Adidas are generally the most popular brands targeted by collectors. Popular fashion trends in sneaker culture usually overlap with streetwear trends and styles.

As of 2016, the most desirable colors for sneakers and apparel were black, red, and white due to their longstanding association with late 1980s new wave music, the Michael Jordan era of basketball, and old-school hip hop. By 2021, however, bright colorways of Nike Dunks – particularly "collabs" with high-profile streetwear designers such as Virgil Abloh's Off-White line and Sacai – began eclipsing even many Air Jordan 1s in popularity.

Sneakerhead slang

During the 2010s, teenage sneakerheads influenced by hip hop fashion and skater subculture began to develop their own jargon. Commonly used words include:

Industry growth and reselling
In response to the significant surge of interest in sneakers between 2010 and 2020, the sneaker market has begun to expand into a variety of different, and oftentimes unique, venues. The growth of online retailing and auction sites has provided sneaker collectors with new methods to find the rarest shoes. Sneaker retailers have begun to adopt creative means to release these limited-production sneakers. Some have implemented a raffle system – for both online sales as well as in-store ones, in some cases – where the winners are chosen at random, while others have implemented a first come, first served model. The SNKRS app was launched in 2015 by Nike to give more access to the latest sneaker drops in addition to expanding its consumer audience. The app implements multiple variations of raffle systems – most notably 10-minute-long "draws" – and as of 2020 mostly eschews the older first come, first served model, given that the large majority of shoes sold via SNKRS are heavily hyped. (Nike still sells the vast majority of its products via its separate, non-SNKRS-related app, along with sales through traditional brick-and-mortar sellers such as Foot Locker as well as large department stores.)

Due to the popularity of these rare sneakers and streetwear culture, the emergence of a large-scale counterfeit market has risen to meet the demand for these highly sought-after sneakers. However, in response to the large counterfeit challenges, new companies have taken off. The shoe reselling market is currently dominated by StockX and GOAT. Sneakers have some of the highest resale multiples among retail consumer goods, and the two aftermarket websites (each of which also allows for buying and selling via custom-designed phone apps) currently have a de facto monopoly on the niche, though eBay launched its own authenticated-sneaker initiative to compete with them (and mitigate their reputation as a common outlet for counterfeit sneaker sales). The old-school sneakerhead community routinely expresses distaste for the resale community, especially buyers who only do so for profit's sake, not appreciation for sneakers' history or artistry. Due to the inflated resell market, it would be wise to look into replica sneakers as the quality have greatly improved throughout the years and are usually around retail price or lower.

Apps like SNKRS were made to give ordinary buyers a fair chance to purchase a given pair, but with mixed results. While Nike has the financial wherewithal to continuously improve the app to prevent bots from exploiting it, this is generally not the case with small, independent sneaker boutiques; on many such sites, bots and proxy servers in particular (which "spoof" IP addresses to obfuscate the fact that dozens, hundreds or even thousands of purchase attempts are being made from a single buyer's computer) have made it effectively impossible in most cases for people to purchase hype sneakers via scheduled drops before they sell out, which typically happens within 2–3 minutes and sometimes within a matter of seconds. While StockX and GOAT have not disclosed how many sellers on their platforms sell goods en masse, they're believed to be the most popular outlets for doing so; StockX sold $1.8 billion in merchandise in 2020 alone (including sportswear and some other lines, but predominantly sneakers). Sneakers are resold for prices that can range from a modest 15%–20% above retail, and up to a 10x (or 1,000%) return on the most coveted, low-production drops.

These sites provide a trusted platform where buyers can buy shoes from sneaker resellers, though on occasion both are accused of delivering counterfeit shoes that somehow passed their "legit checks," the specifics of which are kept close to vest. On both StockX and GOAT, a buyer places an order for a given pair of sneakers, and the seller sends the purchased item(s) to StockX or GOAT facilities for inspection and verification; products are shipped to buyers if they're successfully authenticated. StockX allows registered users to watch and track resale prices in real time, along with publishing longer-term pricing & sales trends for sneakers that have been available for extended periods of time. Additionally, sneakers bought from StockX arrive with a QR coded tag on the shoes as an ostensible guarantee of their authenticity, but some buyers have nonetheless claimed that the shoes they've received are fakes – though given the opaque nature of online sneaker reselling in general, it's rarely possible to discern whether such claims are accurate.

See also 
Benjamin Kapelushnik (sneaker reseller)
Just for Kicks (documentary film)
Sneakerheads (TV series)
2010s teenage fashion
Mars Blackmon (Spike Lee character)

References

Further reading
Michael Khan, "Sneakerheads show sole devotion to footwear", The San Diego Union-Tribune (September 28, 2004).
Richard A. Martin, "The Rebirth of the New York Sneakerhead", The New York Times (July 11, 2004).
Michael Tunison, "'Sneakerheads' Kick It Up a Notch in Search for That Rare Pair", Washington Post (Saturday, February 17, 2007): D01.
Eric Wilson, "Front Row; Sneakerhead Bonanza", The New York Times (March 23, 2006).
Bloomberg, "Sneaker Culture and Street Wear on Bloomberg TV", Bloomberg TV (January 31, 2012).
Cool Hunting, "'Where the Ladies At'", Cool Hunting (October 11, 2005).
Douglas Brundage, "A Close Reading of Hypebeast’s “Streetwear Impact Report”, Medium (May 26, 2019).

Collecting
Fashion
Sneaker culture
Uses of shoes
1980s fashion
2010s fashion
Hip hop fashion
African-American culture